Geese are waterfowl of the family Anatidae. 

Goose may also refer to:

Birds
 One of several wild bird species in the family Anatidae:
 Magpie goose, bird in the closely related family Anseranatidae
 Pygmy goose, birds in the genus Nettapus in the subfamily Anatinae
 Spur-winged goose, a bird in the subfamily Plectropterinae
 Sheldgoose, birds in the subfamily Tadorninae
 Domestic goose, domesticated varieties of either Greylag Goose or Swan Goose

People
 Goose (nickname), a list of people nicknamed Goose or the Goose
 Claire Goose (born 1975), British actress
 Roscoe Goose (1891–1971), American jockey
 Goose Van Schaick (1736–1789), Continental Army officer during the American Revolutionary War

Places
 Gaasefjord, meaning "Goose Fjord", in Eastern Greenland
 Goose (Otter Creek) Water Aerodrome, Newfoundland and Labrador, Canada
 Goose Creek (disambiguation)
 Goose Green (disambiguation)
 Goose Island (disambiguation)
 Goose Lake (disambiguation)
 Goose Pond (disambiguation)

Arts, entertainment, and media
 Goose (American band), an American jam band
 Goose (Belgian band), a Belgian electro rock band
 Game of the Goose, a prototype for many commercial European racing board games
 Goosed (1999), an American film starring Jennifer Tilly
 Gus Goose, a fictional Walt Disney character
 "The Goose", a song by funk band Parliament
 The Goose, a character from the television show Just Jordan
 Goose, a chicken villager from the video game series Animal Crossing
 Goose! (alternately known as Goose on the Loose), a 2006 film starring Chevy Chase

Other uses
 GOOSE (Generic Object Oriented Substation Event), abstract data model mappings in the IEC 61850 communication protocol
 Tailor's goose, a type of clothing iron
 Grumman Goose, American amphibian flying boat
 XSM-73 Goose, American decoy cruise missile

See also
 Father Goose (disambiguation)
 Guus, a common Dutch given name
 Mother Goose (disambiguation)